Won Du-jae (Hanja: 元斗才; born November 18, 1997) is a South Korean football player. He plays for Gimcheon Sangmu.

Career
In 2017, Won came to Japan to play for Avispa Fukuoka in the J2 League. After the end of the 2019 season, he joined K League 1 side Ulsan Hyundai.

Career statistics
.

Honours

Club
Ulsan Hyundai
 AFC Champions League: 2020
 K League 1: 2022

International
 AFC U-23 Championship: 2020

Individual
 AFC U-23 Championship Most Valuable Player: 2020

References

External links
Profile at Avispa Fukuoka

1997 births
Living people
South Korean footballers
South Korea under-20 international footballers
South Korea under-23 international footballers
South Korea international footballers
J2 League players
Avispa Fukuoka players
Association football defenders
South Korean expatriate footballers
Expatriate footballers in Japan
Footballers at the 2020 Summer Olympics
Olympic footballers of South Korea
Footballers from Seoul